Monocentropus balfouri is a tarantula in the Monocentropus genus, it was first described by Reginald Innes Pocock in 1897. This tarantula is also called Socotra Island Blue Baboon Tarantula, usually shortened to Blue Baboon Tarantula. This spider is named after its collector Isaac Bayley Balfour. It is found in Socotra Island, hence the common name. This tarantula is terrestrial and an opportunistic burrower. Like many tarantulas, M. balfouri can be kept as a pet, although it is not a beginner species.

Description 
The adult coloration of M. balfouri is striking, a vivid blue, though some red and amber variants have been seen very rarely. This tarantula's carapace is blue, as is the leg except for the trochanter, which like the rest of the body is a cream color or grey. The opisthosoma (abdomen) is a cream color, grey and partially blue. Females of this species live for about 10 to 14 years of age, while males tend to live for about 3 to 4 years. Its venom potency is not known. Although it is believed by some to be able to kill a dromedary, this is most likely not the case.

Habitat 
This spider is found in Socotra, which is part of Yemen. Socotra is known for having a unique ecosystem. This spider is usually found 850 meters above sea level, the average temperature in Socotra is 28°C with an average of 193 millimeters of annual rainfall, and an average humidity of 65%. Socotra is home to narrow coastal plains, a limestone plateau and the Hajhir Mountains. This island flora is also unique, being home to plants such as Dracaena cinnabari, the Dragon's blood tree.

Behavior 
A unique behavior of this tarantula is that it is communal, to the point that mother spiders care for the young, even attacking potential predators if they get too close to her egg sac. In captivity, multiple males and females of different ages may live together without attacking one another, provided that they have enough food and proper care. When threatened, M. balfouri gives a characteristic “threat pose,” rearing up on the hind legs and baring the chelicerae. Further provocation will lead this tarantula to deliver a fast strike and bite, especially if protecting an egg sac. As it is a species of tarantula found in the Old World, M. balfouri does not possess urticating hairs.

References 

Spiders of Asia
Theraphosidae
Spiders described in 1897
Taxa named by R. I. Pocock